Vera Songwe is an economist and banking executive from Cameroon who has worked for the World Bank since 1998, and in 2015 became Western and Central Africa's regional director for the International Finance Corporation. She is the first woman to head the U.N.s  Economic Commission for Africa (ECA) at the level of Under Secretary-General.

Early life and education
Songwe holds a PhD in Mathematical Economics from the Center for Operations Research and Econometrics and a Master of Arts in Law and Economics and a Diplôme d’études approfondies in Economic Science and Politics from the Université Catholique de Louvain in Belgium. She has a Bachelor of Arts degree in Economics and Political Science from the University of Michigan.

Career
Songwe worked for the Federal Reserve Bank of Minneapolis, and simultaneously had a visiting professor's appointment at the University of Southern California.

In 1998 Songwe joined the World Bank, where she worked in the Poverty Reduction and Economic Management (PREM) unit, covering Morocco and Tunisia. Over the subsequent years, she filled several roles in the PREM unit for East Asia and the Pacific region. In 2010, Songwe was part of the World Bank Group team that raised a historic US$49.3 billion dollars in concessional financing for the low income countries of the world as part of the International Development Association (IDA) 16th replenishment.

From 2011 to 2015 Songwe was Regional Director Africa covering West and Central Africa for the International Finance Corporation (IFC), and Country Director for Senegal, Cape Verde, The Gambia, Guinea Bissau, and Mauritania. Her main areas of interest are fiscal policy, innovative financing mechanisms for development, agriculture, energy and economic governance.

In 2011, Songwe was involved in Africa 2.0, an initiative to bring young Africans together to aid in the continent's economic development. She is a scholar at the Brookings Institution, at its Africa Growth Initiative. Forbes listed her in 2013 as one of the "20 Young Power Women in Africa", and the following year the Institut Choiseul for International Politics and Geoeconomics chose her as one of their "African leaders of tomorrow". In 2015 she collaborated with the newly-founded Tony Elumelu Entrepreneurship Programme, which pledged $100 million for African start-up companies.

In July 2015 Songwe was appointed Regional Director of the IFC for West and Central Africa.

Songwe took up her role as the Executive Secretary of the Economic Commission for Africa (ECA) on 3 August 2017 at the level of Under Secretary-General.

In June 2020, Songwe and others – Nobel laureates in Economics, architects, chefs and leaders of international organizations – signed the appeal in favour of the purple economy (“Towards a cultural renaissance of the economy”), published in Corriere della Sera, El País and Le Monde.

In August 2021, anonymous sources told the press that Songwe announced her resignation during a virtual meeting, and would move to another organization.

Other activities
Songwe serves as a non-resident Senior Fellow at the Brookings Institution’s Africa Growth Initiative. She is also a member of the African Union Institutional reform team under the direction of the President of Rwanda, Paul Kagame, and a board member of the African Leadership Network, the Mo Ibrahim Foundation, and ID4Africa.

In early 2021, Songwe was appointed by the G20 to the High Level Independent Panel (HLIP) on financing the global commons for pandemic preparedness and response, co-chaired by Ngozi Okonjo-Iweala, Tharman Shanmugaratnam and Lawrence Summers.

Speeches 

 Statement by the Executive Secretary at the Fourth Conference of Ministers Responsible for Civil Registration  - Lusaka, Zambia, 07 December 2017 
Statement by the Executive Secretary at the opening of the African Economic Conference, Addis Ababa Ethiopia, 04 December 2017 
Statement by the Executive Secretary at the opening of  the Conference on Land Policy in Africa (CLPA-2017) Addis Ababa Ethiopia, 14 November 2017 
Statement by Dr. Vera Songwe, United Nations Under-Secretary-General and Executive Secretary of the UNECA at the Opening Session of the 18th Executive Council Meeting of the Extraordinary Summit on the African Continental  Free Trade Area
Closing the Tech Gender Gap

Publications 

 “Winning the Fight against Corruption: A Sustainable Path to Africa’s Transformation”

Featured articles 

 Africa Finance Ministers conference discusses importance of digital economy to continent
 La mauvaise gouvernance tue les jeunes Africains selon la Fondation Mo Ibrahim
 Strengthening National Accounts, SDGs And Employment At The Heart Of ECA-Egypt Bilateral Meeting
 Mo Ibrahim: African migrations are an opportunity, not a crisis
 Concerns have emerged as Africa nations move to ratify the biggest free trade agreement, African Continental Free Trade Agreement in May 2019.
 Lack of domestic revenue crippling African economies
 Half of the world’s youth will be African
 Africa urged to speed up digitization
 Conferência discute investimentos na economia digital
 Poor governance is killing Africa’s young people - Mo Ibrahim Foundation
 Africa Fintech association launched in Morocco
 Économie et développement
 Africa's free trade area comes into force as Gambia ratification
 Gambia ratifies AfCFTA, putting it into motion
 Les gouvernements africains priés d’adopter la transformation numérique
Identifying and addressing land governance constraints to support intensification and land market operation: Evidence from 10 African countries

External links

 https://twitter.com/SongweVera

References

Living people
Cameroonian economists
World Bank people
People from Bamenda
Université catholique de Louvain alumni
Cameroonian expatriates in the United States
Cameroonian women economists
University of Michigan College of Literature, Science, and the Arts alumni
Wiki Loves Women Writing Contest
Year of birth missing (living people)